Lara Malsiner (born 14 April 2000) is an Italian ski jumper. She has competed at World Cup level since the 2015/16 season, with her best individual result being third place in Hinzenbach on 9 February 2020. Her older sister is Manuela Malsiner and her younger sister is Jessica Malsiner, both of whom compete at World Cup level.

References

2000 births
Living people
Sportspeople from Sterzing
Italian female ski jumpers
Ski jumpers at the 2018 Winter Olympics
Olympic ski jumpers of Italy
Ski jumpers at the 2016 Winter Youth Olympics
21st-century Italian women